The 2022 NCAA Division II women's basketball tournament was the single-elimination tournament to determine the national champion of women's NCAA Division II college basketball in the United States.

The championship rounds were held March 21–25, 2022, at the Birmingham CrossPlex in Birmingham, Alabama. Glenville State won its first title by defeating Western Washington, 85–72.

The tournament returned to its pre-COVID-19 pandemic field of sixty-four teams.

Tournament schedule and venues

Regionals
First, second, and third-round games, which comprise each regional championship, will take place on campus sites on March 11, 12, and 14. The top-seeded team in each regional serves as host.

These eight locations were chosen to host regional games for the 2022 tournament:
 Atlantic: Waco Center, Glenville State University, Glenville, West Virginia
 Central: Gross Memorial Coliseum, Fort Hays State University, Hays, Kansas
 East: Stan Spirou Field House, Southern New Hampshire University, Manchester, New Hampshire
 Midwest: Kates Gymnasium, Ashland University, Ashland, Ohio
 South: Fred DeLay Gymnasium, Union University, Jackson, Tennessee
 South Central: First United Bank Center, West Texas A&M University, Canyon, Texas
 Southeast: UNG Convocation Center, University of North Georgia, Dahlonega, Georgia
 West: Pioneer Gym, California State University, East Bay, Hayward, California

Elite Eight
The national quarterfinals, semifinals, and finals will be held on March 21, 23, and 25 at a pre-determined site, the Birmingham CrossPlex in Birmingham, Alabama.

Qualification
A total of sixty-four bids are available for the tournament: 23 automatic bids (awarded to the champions of the twenty-one Division II conferences) and 41 at-large bids.

The bids are allocated evenly among the eight NCAA-designated regions (Atlantic, Central, East, Midwest, South, South Central, Southeast, and West), each of which contains either two or three of the twenty-three Division II conferences that sponsor men's basketball (after the Heartland Conference disbanded in 2019, the South Region now features only two conferences). Each region consists of two or three automatic qualifiers (the teams who won their respective conference tournaments) and either five or six at-large bids, awarded regardless of conference affiliation.

Automatic bids (23)

At-large bids (41)

Regionals

Atlantic Regional
 Site: Glenville, West Virginia (Glenville State)

* – Denotes overtime period

Central Regional
 Site: Hays, Kansas (Fort Hays State)

* – Denotes overtime period

East Regional
 Site: Manchester, New Hampshire (Southern New Hampshire)

Midwest Regional
 Site: Ashland, Ohio (Ashland)

South Regional
 Site: Jackson, Tennessee (Union (TN))

South Central Regional
 Site: Canyon, Texas (West Texas A&M)

* – Denotes overtime period

Southeast Regional
 Site: Dahlonega, Georgia (North Georgia)

West Regional
 Site: Hayward, California (Cal State East Bay)

* – Denotes overtime period

Elite Eight - Birmingham, Alabama
Location: Birmingham CrossPlex

All-tournament team
 Re'Shawna Stone, Glenville State
 Zakiyah Winfield, Glenville State
 Dazha Congleton, Glenville State
 Emma Duff, Western Washington
 Brooke Walling, Western Washington

See also 
 2022 NCAA Division I women's basketball tournament
 2022 NCAA Division III women's basketball tournament
 2022 NAIA women's basketball tournament
 2022 NCAA Division II men's basketball tournament

References 

NCAA Division II women's basketball tournament
2022 in sports in Alabama